Tarkwa is a town and is the capital of Tarkwa-Nsuaem Municipal district, a district in the Western Region southwest of South Ghana. Tarkwa has a 2013 settlement population of 34,941 people.

Economy

Mining
Tarkwa is noted as a centre of gold mining and manganese mining. Tarkwa Mine, which is a large open-cast gold mine, is situated to the northwest of the town, and Nsuta manganese mine is situated to the east of the town. Tarkwa Mine mines several low-grade conglomeratic "reefs" of Tarkwaian type. These reefs are of mid-Proterozoic age.

A number of mining companies cluster between the villages of Aboso and Tamso in the late 19th century.

Tarkwa Mine has the distinction of being one of the largest gold mines in South Ghana. Approximately 24 tons of gold is produced annually, and 100 million tons of earth is moved to achieve this production rate. The Iduapriem Gold Mine is also located near Tarkwa, 10 km south of the town. The Tarkwa Goldfield was discovered a few years before the Witwatersrand Goldfield in South Africa.

Climate

Education

High schools
Tarkwa Senior High School (TARSCO) and Fiaseman Senior High School (FIASEC) are located in Tarkwa

University
University of Mines and Technology (UMaT), is located in Tarkwa.

Transport

Train
Tarkwa is a junction railway station and is served by Tarkwa Train Station on the Ghana Railway Corporation.

See also 
 Railway stations in Ghana
 Geology of Ghana
 Birimian
 Akan goldweights

References 

...

Populated places in the Western Region (Ghana)